The Eaves Cougar 1 is an American homebuilt aircraft that was designed by Leonard R. Eaves of Oklahoma City, Oklahoma and made available in the form of plans for amateur construction.

Design and development
The Eaves Cougar 1 was based upon the Nesmith Cougar and features a strut-braced high wing, a two-seats-in-side-by-side configuration enclosed cockpit, fixed conventional landing gear and a single engine in tractor configuration.

The aircraft is made from welded steel tubing and wood, covered in doped aircraft fabric. Its wing has a  span and can be folded for storage or ground transportation. Engines used typically range from  but the airframe can accept engines as powerful as the  Lycoming O-320.

The construction of the prototype was commenced in January 1957 at Eaves' home in Oklahoma City. The design won third place in the 1963 Experimental Aircraft Association aircraft design competition. It was featured on the cover of Sport Aviation magazine in February 1963.

Eaves was killed in the crash of another homebuilt aircraft design on 3 March 2012 at age 92 and plans for the Cougar appear to be no longer available.

Specifications (Cougar 1)

References

Cougar 001
1960s United States sport aircraft
Single-engined tractor aircraft
High-wing aircraft
Homebuilt aircraft